was the first wife of Emperor Jimmu, first Emperor of Japan. Jimmu later married Himetataraisuzu-hime who became the first Empress of Japan, and whose children inherited the throne. Her son Tagishimimi would attempt to seize power violently due to not inheriting the throne.

In the Kojiki, she is called Ahira-hime (吾平媛). According to the Nihon Shoki, she is from Hyūga Province.

Note that the -hime (媛) on the end is the word for "princess", and that tsu (津) appears in Old Japanese as the genitive particle, which was sometimes omitted from names.

Genealogy 
There is no mention of her parents in either the Nihon Shoki or the Kojiki.

The Kojiki also lists one  (隼人阿多君, "Lord Ata of the Hayato") as a descendant of Hoderi.

This  seems to be the same person as  who appears in the Nihon Shoki as a descendant of Hosuseri. As such, some have pointed to a connection between this person and the Hayato people that also appear in the Nihon Shoki as descendants of Hosuseri.

 Husband: Emperor Jimmu - Nihon Shoki
 Emperor Jimmu - In the Nihon Shoki, he was the first Emperor of Japan (although he was not on the throne at the time and was a crown prince).
 Child: Tagishimimi - Nihon Shoki
 After the fall of Emperor Jimmu, he was killed for his treason (Tagishimi's treason) against Crown Prince Emperor Suizei.
 Child: Kisumimi - mentioned in Kujiki as Ken-mimi. He is not mentioned in the Nihon Shoki.

Tree 
（Reference：『Nihon Shoki』、『Ancient House Series Catalogue』）

Records 
According to Nihon Shoki, Emperor Jimmu (then a prince) took Princess Ohiraizu as his consort while he was in Hyūga before he made the Eastern Expedition.

References 

 

History of Kagoshima Prefecture
Ancient Japanese women
Year of birth missing

Year of death missing